Severin Hingsamer (born 20 March 2000) is an Austrian footballer who plays for SV Ried II.

References

Austrian footballers
2. Liga (Austria) players
2000 births
Living people
SV Ried players
Austria youth international footballers
Association football defenders